American actor Terry Crews is known for playing Sergeant/Lieutenant/Captain Terry Jeffords in the Fox/NBC sitcom Brooklyn Nine-Nine, Julius on the UPN/The CW sitcom Everybody Hates Chris and for his appearances in Old Spice commercials, as well as for roles in films such as The Expendables and its first two sequels.

He also stars as Nick Kingston-Persons on the TBS sitcom Are We There Yet? and as himself on the BET reality series The Family Crews.

Crews is currently the host of the hit reality show America's Got Talent and has hosted its spin-offs America's Got Talent: The Champions, America's Got Talent: Extreme, and America's Got Talent: All-Stars.

Film

Television

Video games

Web series

Music videos

Attractions

References

 General

 

 Specific

External links
 
 

Crews, Terry
Crews, Terry